The Vickers Vanguard was a 1920s British airliner developed by Vickers Limited from the Victoria.

Design and development
Developed from the earlier Victoria with the introduction of a wider fuselage, the Vanguard was a 22-passenger twin-engined biplane. Originally built for the Air Ministry as the Type 62 the aircraft powered by two 450 hp Napier Lion engines first flew on 18 July 1923. It was re-engined in 1925 with two 650 hp Rolls-Royce Condor IIIs and re-designated the Type 103. When it was handed over to Imperial Airways in 1925 it was described as the World's largest passenger aeroplane.

The aircraft was re-conditioned in 1928 and re-designated the Type 170 for use by Imperial Airways for route proving trials, starting in May 1928. Ii operated on the London-Paris route, typically taking about 2 hrs, and then on the London Brussels-Cologne service.   It set a world load carrying record on 6 July 1928.  The aircraft was withdrawn from its airline duties in October 1928 for modifications, probably to the tail, but crashed at Shepperton, Middlesex on 16 May 1929 at the start of flying trials, killing the pilot Tiny Scholefield and the flight observer Frank Sharrett..

Variants
Type 62 
Prototype with two 450hp Napier Lion engines, one built.
Type 103
Type 62 re-engined with two Condor III engines.
Type 170
Type 103 re-conditioned for Imperial Airways.

Specifications (Type 170)

Video
Newsreel footage of Vickers Type 170 Vanguard in flight

See also

References

Notes

Bibliography

1920s British airliners
Vanguard
Aviation accidents and incidents in England

no:Vickers Virginia
sv:Vickers Virginia